The Chichester by-election was a Parliamentary by-election. It returned one Member of Parliament (MP)  to the House of Commons of the United Kingdom, elected by the first past the post voting system. It was held on 2 June 1905 after the incumbent Conservative MP Lord Edmund Talbot was appointed as Lord Commissioner of the Treasury and he was obliged to stand again in a ministerial by-election. It was retained by Talbot.

Vacancy
Lord Edmund Talbot had been Conservative MP for the seat of Chichester since the 1894 Chichester by-election. He was appointed as Lord Commissioner of the Treasury and he was obliged to stand again in a ministerial by-election.

Electoral history
The seat had been Conservative since creation in 1868. Lord Edmund Talbot held the seat at the last election, unopposed:

Talbot had always been returned unopposed. The last contest in the constituency came in 1892, when the Conservative out-polled the Liberal by nearly two to one.

Candidates
The local Conservative Association re-selected 50 year-old Lord Edmund Talbot as their candidate to defend the seat. The local Liberal Association selected 33 year-old John Ernest Allen as their candidate to challenge for the seat. Allen was a Barrister-at-law, who had been educated at both Oxford and Cambridge Universities where he gained a Master of Arts.

Campaign
Polling Day was fixed for the 2 June 1905, the day after the 1905 Whitby by-election. On the eve of poll, the Liberals gained Whitby from the Conservatives.

Result
The Conservatives held the seat with their lowest majority since 1885:

Aftermath
At the following General Election, Talbot again held the seat, the result was:

References

History of Sussex
1905 in England
1905 elections in the United Kingdom
Politics of Chichester
Elections in West Sussex
Chichester
By-elections to the Parliament of the United Kingdom in West Sussex constituencies